Every Day Is a Holiday is a 2009 film by the Lebanese director Dima El-Horr. The film is on the official selection of 2009 Toronto International Film Festival. It is the first feature film by Dima El-Horr.

Plot
Three women, of different backgrounds, are on their way to prison to pay a visit to their men on independence day. As the story progresses, this journey becomes a quest for their own independence.

Cast
Hiam Abbas
Manal Khader as Lina
Raïa Haidar as Tamara

Reception
Dennis Harvey of Variety wrote "A busload of stranded women wander a stark no-man's-land in Dima El-Horr's feature debut".

References

External links

French comedy-drama films
2000s Arabic-language films
2000s French-language films
2009 comedy-drama films
Lebanese comedy-drama films
2009 multilingual films
French multilingual films
Lebanese multilingual films
2000s French films